Juan David Martínez (born 3 May 2001) is a Colombian football player who plays as forward for Kukësi.

References

2001 births
Living people
Colombian footballers
Categoría Primera A players
Cortuluá footballers
Association football forwards